The 1976 NCAA Division I baseball tournament was played at the end of the 1976 NCAA Division I baseball season to determine the national champion of college baseball.  The tournament concluded with eight teams competing in the College World Series, a double-elimination tournament in its thirtieth year.  Eight regional competitions were held to determine the participants in the final event.  Seven regions held a four team, double-elimination tournament while one region included six teams, resulting in 34 teams participating in the tournament at the conclusion of their regular season, and in some cases, after a conference tournament.  The thirtieth tournament's champion was Arizona, coached by Jerry Kindall.  The Most Outstanding Player was Steve Powers of Arizona.

Regionals
Seven of the eight regionals were played as 4-team double-elimination tournaments.  One regional was played as a 6-team double-elimination tournament.  The winner of each regional moved onto the College World Series.

Atlantic Regional
Games played in Columbia, South Carolina.

Rocky Mountain Regional
Games played in Tempe, Arizona.

Mideast Regional
Games played in Ypsilanti, Michigan.

South Regional
Games played in Tallahassee, Florida.

Midwest Regional
Games played in Edinburg, Texas.

South Central Regional
Games played in Arlington, Texas.

West Regional
Games played in Pullman, Washington.

Northeast Regional
Games played in Storrs, Connecticut.

College World Series

Participants

Results

Bracket

Game results

All-Tournament Team
The following players were members of the All-Tournament Team.

Notable players
 Arizona: Ron Hassey, Dave Stegman
 Arizona State: Gary Allenson, Chris Bando, Floyd Bannister, Mike Colbern, Bob Horner, Dave Hudgens, Darrell Jackson, Ken Landreaux, Chris Nyman, Bob Pate, Rick Peters, Ken Phelps, Gary Rajsich
 Auburn: Joe Beckwith, Terry Leach
 Clemson: Ron Musselman, Chuck Porter, Kurt Seibert
 Eastern Michigan: Glenn Gulliver, John Martin, Bob Owchinko, Bob Welch
 Maine: Jack Leggett, Bert Roberge
 Oklahoma: Terry Bogener, Keith Drumright, George Frazier, Gene Krug, Roger LaFrancois
 Washington State: Dave Edler, Eric Wilkins, Tom Niedenfuer

Tournament Notes
The Arizona State team featured 13 future Major League players – a record matched by the school's team from the previous year.  
Arizona head coach Jerry Kindall became the first person to win a College World Series as both a player (1956, Minnesota) and a coach.  
Keith Drumright appeared in his fourth College World Series.
Eastern Michigan was the last northern school to play in the final game of the College World Series for 43 years, until Michigan in 2019.

See also
 1976 NCAA Division II baseball tournament
 1976 NCAA Division III baseball tournament (inaugural edition)
 1976 NAIA World Series

References

NCAA Division I Baseball Championship
Tournament
NCAA Division I Baseball
Baseball in the Dallas–Fort Worth metroplex